Nationalliga A may refer to:
National League (ice hockey), the top ice hockey league in Switzerland
Swiss LNA, the top roller hockey league in Switzerland
Swiss Super League, formerly the Nationalliga A, the top football league in Switzerland
Nationalliga A (women's football), the top football women's league in Switzerland
Nationalliga A (American football), the top American football league in Switzerland